Črmošnjice may refer to:
 Črmošnjice pri Stopičah, a settlement in Municipality of Novo Mesto, southeastern Slovenia
 Črmošnjice, Semič,  a settlement in Municipality of Semič, southeastern Slovenia